Tribl Nights Atlanta is the second live album by American contemporary worship groups Tribl. The album was released on November 12, 2021, via Tribl Records. The featured worship leaders on the album are Dante Bowe, Mariah Adigun, Ryan Ofei, Joe L Barnes, Jekalyn Carr, Tianna Horsey, Jonathan Traylor, Lizzie Morgan, Montel Moore, Doe, Melvin Crispell III, and Chandler Moore. The album was produced by Tony Brown and Jonathan Jay.

Tribl Nights Atlanta debuted at number 46 on Billboard's Top Christian Albums Chart and at number six Top Gospel Albums Chart in the United States. The album won the GMA Dove Award for Gospel Worship Album of the Year at the 2022 GMA Dove Awards.

Background
Tribl Nights Atlanta is a live album recorded during the Tribl Worship Night event series in Atlanta. The album is a collection containing new recordings and cover songs, closing with a sermonette delivered by Chandler Moore.

Release and promotion
Tribl released "Ways for Me" featuring Dante Bowe as the lead single from the album on October 29, 2021. Tribl also released "We Have Hope" featuring Joe L Barnes, Jonathan Traylor and Lizzie Morgan as the second single from the album on the same day.

Accolades

Commercial performance
In the United States, Tribl Nights Atlanta debuted at number ten on the Top Christian Albums Chart, and at number three the Top Gospel Albums Chart, dated November 27, 2021.

Track listing

Charts

Weekly charts

Year-end charts

Release history

References

External links
 

2021 live albums
Tribl albums